Madison Township is one of sixteen townships in Buchanan County, Iowa, USA.  As of the 2000 census, its population was 768.

Geography 

According to the USGS, it contains two cemeteries: Campton and Madison.

History
Madison Township was organized in 1857.

References

External links 
 US-Counties.com
 City-Data.com

Townships in Buchanan County, Iowa
Townships in Iowa
1857 establishments in Iowa
Populated places established in 1857